Astorga is a municipality in the state of Paraná in Brazil.  It was founded in 1951.  As of 2020, the estimated population was 26,209 inhabitants.

References 

Populated places established in 1951
Municipalities in Paraná